Virgil Preda (2 September 1923 - 23 October 2011) was a Romanian painter.

Studies

 Finished the studies of Private Academy of Art in Bucharest 1948.
 The studies of Law University between 1943–1947, in Bucharest.

Debut

 Preda was born in Bucharest. He exhibited for the first time to the yearly exhibition in 1962 in Bucharest.

One man shows România

 1965 Painting exhibition "Galateea" Gallery Bucharest 
 1969 Painting exhibition "Orizont" Gallery Bucharest 
 1975 Painting exhibition "Eforie" Gallery Bucharest
 1978 Painting exhibition "Eforie" Gallery Bucharest
 1983 Istituto Italiano di Cultura in România Bucharest
 1985 Painting exhibition "Orizont" Gallery Bucharest 
 1994 Painting exhibition "Simeza" Gallery
 1996 Painting exhibition Gallery of Brazilian Embassy in Bucharest.
 2001 Painting exhibition "Simeza" Gallery, Bucharest

One man shows opened abroad

 1977 - "Raffadali" Galiery Raffadali Italy
 1979 - Romano Galiery Agrigento Italy
 1990 Painting exhibition: attitude dialogue Galiery "Orizont" Bucharest

Group exhibitions in state and abroad

 1971 "Apollo" Galiery Bucharest
 1983 "Căminul Artei" Galiery Bucharest
 1984 "Eforie Galiery" Bucharest
 1986 "Orizont Galiery" Bucharest 
 1990 "Orizont Galiery" Bucharest
 1968 Romanian art exhibition Orly France
 1969 Romanian art exhibition Prague Tcecoslovaquie 
 1973 Romanian art exhibition Venice Italy
 Romanian art exhibition Tokyo Japan
 1984  Exhibition at Academia Romena di Cultura Roma Italy
 1985 Exhibition 18 Painters from România Rotour Tamnusanlage 18 Galiery FrankfurtamMain Germany
 1992 Romanian art exhibition "Steven Metzier" Galiery Denver Colorado-SUA

Private collections in Romania and abroad
Romania, France, Italy, Germany, Belgium, Hungaria, Japon, U.S.A.

Bibliography
 Octavian Barbosa 'The Dictionary of Romanian Contemporary Artists"; 
 Dan Grigorescu Idea and Sensibility; 
 Alexandru Cebuc, Vasile Florea, Negoiţă Lăptoiu - The encyclopedia of the contemporary Romanian artist. Ed. ARC 2000 Bucharest

Notes

References

Romanian painters
1923 births
2011 deaths
Artists from Bucharest